Thomson Broadcast is a French electronics manufacturer which designs, produces, deploys and services television and medium-wave radio transmission systems.

History 
Thomson Broadcast is a legacy of the former Thomson Group, which first transmitted television programs on July 10, 1937 from the Eiffel Tower. Thomson Group led to the creation of two companies in 1995: Thomson-CSF, specializing in defense and Thomson Multimedia (TMM), specializing in electronic consumer goods. Thomson Multimedia acquired the DVD manufacturer Technicolor and Grass Valley, a company focusing on cameras and video technology, in 2000 and 2001. This reinforced a strategy to produce and sell professional equipment (instead of consumer goods) which was fully implemented in 2005, when Thomson acquired Thales Broadcast & Multimedia.

From 2000 to 2008, Thomson/Thales Broadcast & Multimedia reinforced its position in transmission deployment. In 2000, Thales Multimedia Multimedia introduced two one-megawatt longwave transmitters in Roumoules, France, to broadcast Radio Monte Carlo from Great Britain to North Africa. In 2008, the National Academy of Television Arts and Sciences (NATAS) gave a Technology and Engineering Emmy Award for outstanding achievement in technical or engineering development in the "Monitoring for compliance standards for ATSC & DVB transport streams" category to Thomson, Pixelmetrix, Tektronix and Rohde & Schwarz. That year, All India Radio ordered a one-megawatt S7HP medium-wave transmitter from Thomson. In 2009, Thomson experienced serious financial difficulty. The following year, Thomson Grass Valley announced the sale of its radio and television transmission activities to a German private equity firm and was renamed Technicolor.

The Arelis Group acquired Thomson Broadcast's transmission portfolio, including its radio and television transmitter lines, in December 2012. Based on the Arelis Group's manufacturing capability, Thomson Broadcast received a contract to deploy next stage transmission DTT (digital terrestrial television) transmitters to Israel. By 2013, its asset turnover was said to have increased by 20 percent; this growth led to a global increase of 440 percent from 2012 to 2015. The Cape Verde digital transition was achieved with a Thomson Broadcast transmission turnkey system in 2015, and the company competed in other African projects against the Chinese media company StarTimes. Proposing DTT system and medium-wave radio transmission systems around the world, Thomson Broadcast is involved in Digital Video Broadcasting and Digital Radio Mondiale.

In August 2018, Thomson Broadcast was acquired by Groupe Sipromad, and is currently managed as part of the Technology Business Unit under the entity Phenixya.

In April 2022, Thomson Broadcast began the process of acquiring GatesAir. The acquisition was closed in August 2022.

Products 
Products manufactured by Thomson Broadcast include:
 Radio and television transmission systems
 Gigativy high-power television transmitters
 Megativy II medium-power television transmitters
 Dreamline low-power television transmitters
 S7HP Neo medium-wave radio transmitters
 RF passive components

References

External links 
 

Electronics companies of France